The 2021–22 Continental Cup was the 24th edition of the IIHF Continental Cup, Europe's second-tier ice hockey club competition organised by International Ice Hockey Federation. The season began on 24 September 2021 and the final tournament was scheduled to be played from 4 to 6 March 2022.

The Polish team Cracovia won the tournament for the first time, thanks to which they got the right to participate in the 2022–23 Champions Hockey League.

Qualified teams

First round

Group A
The Group A tournament was played in Brașov, Romania, from 24 to 26 September 2021.

All times are local (UTC+3).

Group B
The Group B tournament was played in Vilnius, Lithuania, from 24 to 26 September 2021.

All times are local (UTC+3).

Second round

Group C
The Group C tournament was played in Budapest, Hungary, from 22 to 24 October 2021.

All times are local (UTC+2).

Group D
The Group D tournament was played in Amiens, France, from 22 to 24 October 2021.

All times are local (UTC+2).

Third round

Group E
The Group E tournament was played in Krakow, Poland, from 19 to 21 November 2021.

All times are local (UTC+1).

Group F
The Group F tournament was played in Aalborg, Denmark, from 19 to 21 November 2021.

All times are local (UTC+1).

Final round
The final tournament was played in Aalborg, Denmark, from 4 to 6 March 2022.

All times are local (UTC+1).

See also
 2021–22 Champions Hockey League

References

IIHF Continental Cup
2021–22 in European ice hockey